Wimmin' is a song recorded by American musician Ashley Hamilton. The song, for which Robbie Williams receives co-writing credit, was released as a single in June 2003. It reached number 27 in the UK Singles Chart.

Background
Ashley Hamilton is the son of famous actor George Hamilton, and the now ex-stepson of legendary singer Rod Stewart. After reportedly meeting British singer and former Take That band member Robbie Williams at an Alcoholics Anonymous meeting - a claim which Hamilton has denied - Williams and Hamilton wrote the song together. After recording the song, it was released as a single, charting within the top 40 in the United Kingdom and reaching a peak of number 27.

Track listing

Charts

References

2003 singles
2003 songs
Songs written by Robbie Williams
Epic Records singles
Columbia Records singles